Double-stranded RNA-specific editase 1 is an enzyme that in humans is encoded by the ADARB1 gene. The enzyme is a member of ADAR family.

Function 

This gene encodes the enzyme responsible for pre-mRNA editing of the glutamate receptor subunit B by site-specific deamination of adenosines. Studies in rats found that this enzyme acted on its own pre-mRNA molecules to convert an AA dinucleotide to an AI dinucleotide which resulted in a new splice site. Alternative splicing of this gene results in several transcript variants, some of which have been characterized by the presence or absence of an Alu cassette insert and a short or long C-terminal region.

ADARB1 requires the small molecule inositol hexakisphosphate (IP6) for proper function. ADARB1 is an A-to-I RNA-editing enzyme that mostly acts on protein-coding substrates.

See also 
 Adenosine deaminase (ADA), an enzyme acting on isolated adenosine

References

Further reading

External links 
 

EC 3.5